Inter mirifica (Among the wonderful), subtitled "Decree on the Media of Social Communication", is one of the Second Vatican Council's 16 magisterial documents.

The final text was approved on 24 November 1963 by a vote of 1,598 to 503. On 4 December 1963, it was promulgated by Pope Paul VI, after another vote, this time of 1,960 in favour and 164 opposed.

It is composed of 24 points, with the aim of addressing the concerns and problems of social communication. Inter mirifica identifies social communication as the press, cinema, television, and other similar types of communication interfaces.

The term social communications, apart from its more general use, has become the preferred term within documents of the Catholic Church for reference to media or mass media.  It has the advantage, as a term, of wider connotation - all communication is social but not all communication is "mass".  In effect, though, the two terms are used synonymously.

Historical background
While Inter mirifica was one of the first decrees to reach a conclusion during Vatican II, the document itself went through many drafts, throughout its development. Over 70 drafts of Inter mirifica were prepared, yet out of all of these drafts, only nine were ready for final approval from the Vatican Council. The first draft Schema of a constitution on the Means of Social Communications, combined with the other six, were made into one volume by July 1962.  This draft document consisted of an Introduction (nos 1-5), doctrines of the Church (6-33), the Apostolate of the Church in the field (34-48), the discipline and the ecclesiastical order  (49-63), the different means of social communication (64-105), other means of Social Communication (106-111) and a conclusion (112-114). Although the discussion on Inter mirifica lasted for a short period (November 23–27, 1962), the document had a drastic change. The final draft, reduced to a quarter of its original length, which contains an introductory section, two short chapters and a conclusion.

Themes of Inter mirifica
 need for pastoral directive
 responsibility of the Church to monitor the use of social communications and media and ensure the spiritual well being of the Church community at large
 responsibility of the individual to ensure their own well being and to ensure they are not causing themselves "spiritual harm"
 responsibility of the media, including those involved in producing media

Summary

Introduction (#1–2)
 The Council states that, with God’s help, man has created many means of social communications. These means of social communication can be used to reach all types of people around the world, and can be used to educate and inform. The Catholic Church recognizes that if these tools of social communication be used properly, they can greatly benefit mankind. Reversely, if used improperly, they are incredibly detrimental. The authors state that Inter mirifica will look at the problematic issues of social media, and ways that the Church can fix these problems.

Chapter One: On the Teaching of the Church (#3–12)
 The authors of Inter mirifica state that it is within the Church’s birthright to use the means of social communication to the pursuit of preaching the gospel and of salvation.
 There are three questions of morality within social communications that the authors of the decree look at:
 The media has an obligation to provide correct, honest, and accurate news, as the Council believes that access to information, in relation to their circumstances, is a human right.
 There is a question of morality in the news. The Council insists that news may only be effectively delivered if the information provided is of a true moral order.
 While the Council states that at times information can be harmful as long as it is more profitable than harmful, it is necessary for said news to be heard.
 There is also a responsibility that lays upon different groups of people to ensure that what they are allowing themselves to listen to, watch, etc. is of good and sound morality. There is the obligation of the listener to avoid social communications that would cause “spiritual harm”. There is also the problem of youth, and ensuring that they receive information from social communications in moderation and under the supervision of teachers, parents, etc. Youth should be going to these educators with questions, but the educators should also be diligent in ensuring that what the youth are listening to are too of high morality.

Chapter Two: On the Pastoral Activity of the Church (#13–22)
 Chapter II of Inter mirifica showcases a positive view of media, as gifts of God and expresses the need for a healthy relationship between both parties. Because the Vatican Council sees that all forms of media (including radio, TV, newspaper and cinema) are very influential to all persons, the Council trusts that all media personnel will adhere to the teachings and desires of the Catholic Church (as described in Chapter one).
 There is a strong sense of responsibility and leadership that the Vatican Council expects all Church authorities to have. In doing so, all members of the Church are able to ensure a positive message of the Church in media, as well as a way for authorities to remove any harmful projects as well. These responsibilities include:
 The establishment of a Christian press.
 Bishops over-seeing media projects in their own dioceses.
 Teaching the Vatican's ideas of the media and the Church, with younger age groups, within seminaries and Catholic schools.
 The overall relationship between the Catholic Church and the media, to the Vatican Council, is a way to help with the advancement of man's being and their religious journey. Therefore, through the use of media, all individuals are able to learn about the teachings of the Catholic Church and move towards truth and goodness.

Appendices (#23–24)
 The Council states in its conclusion of Inter mirifica that it looks forward to a relationship between Catholic authorities and all media personnel, that will result in the use of social media and communication to reflect the Council's principles and rules. With their instruction, all members of the Catholic Church will be able to confidently accept these regulations, which will lead to the good of the Catholic mission and all of humanity.

Effects and aftermath of Inter mirifica
The document's immediate reception was fairly negative. The document was heavily criticized for falling short of expectations, as well as failing to provide any new or different thoughts or instructions on social communications. At the close of the Council, in a brief assessment of the documents it had produced, the New York Times said this text had been "generally condemned as inadequate and too conservative". These sentiments have been the long-standing memories of the document, with these sentiments continuing 40 years following the decree.

However, the document did provide the beginning stages for further Church instructions on social communications, with the further documents of Communio et Progressio and Aetatis Novae. Furthermore, from the document emerged World Social Communication Day, which was created by the Second Vatican Council to provide an annual message for the church to its people and the rest of the world. Pope John Paul II vigorously promoted responsibility and positive goals in Social Communication not only in person but through messages given on this religious festival and through supporting the Pontifical Council for Social Communications.

Later documents
As mentioned previously, in the follow up and expansion of Inter mirifica, the document Communio et progressio was later written in 1971 as an update to Inter mirifica. A further document, Aetatis Novae, was published in 1992. In 2005, John Paul II wrote his final apostolic letter, The Rapid Development, on the topic of social communications

In his message "The Priest and Pastoral Ministry in a Digital World: New Media at the Service of the Word" to priests for the 44th World Communications Day (16 May 2010), Pope Benedict XVI called for them to become digital citizens and engage with the information society, saying, "Priests stand at the threshold of a new era: as new technologies create deeper forms of relationship across greater distances, they are called to respond pastorally by putting the media ever more effectively at the service of the Word.... Who better than a priest, as a man of God, can develop and put into practice, by his competence in current digital technology, a pastoral outreach capable of making God concretely present in today’s world and presenting the religious wisdom of the past as a treasure which can inspire our efforts to live in the present with dignity while building a better future?"

Further reading
 Inter mirifica: 50 Years Since the Promulgation of the Vatican II Decree on Communications (Vatican Source)
 Pentin, Edward, "Inter mirifica and the Changing World of Communication", National Catholic Register, 15 Nov., 2013.
 Tanner, Norman P. The Church and the World : Gaudium et spes, Inter mirifica. New York: Paulist Press, 2005.

References

External links
 Vatican II Decree of Inter mirifica.

Documents of the Second Vatican Council
1963 documents
1963 in Christianity
Christian media